Moon Warriors (in Chinese 戰神傳說) is a 1992 Hong Kong wuxia film directed by Sammo Hung, written by Alex Law and starring Andy Lau, Kenny Bee, Anita Mui and Maggie Cheung.

Plot
Fei (Andy Lau) is a simple fisherman who possesses great sword-fighting prowess and rescues the 13th Prince of Yin (Kenny Bee) from assassins sent by his brother, the 14th Prince (Kelvin Wong), who is attempting to usurp his throne. Fei invites the injured 13th Prince and his entourage to his village and allows the prince to heal, and the two become fast friends. The next morning, the 14th Prince's troupes have made their way to the village, so Fei leads the 13th Prince and his entourage to hide inside a mausoleum, which turns out to be the tomb of the King of Yin, the 13th Prince's father, and thus, Fei learns of the prince's identity. Fei joins the 13th Prince on his journey to find the Lord of Lan-ling (Chang Yi), hoping to get assistant from the lord's army to defeat the 14th Prince, but they encounter the 14th Prince and his troupes. While fighting off the troupes, the 13th Prince entrusts his bodyguard, Mo-sin (Maggie Cheung) and gives Fei a piece of jade to meet the Lord of Lan-ling and escort his daughter and the prince's fiancé, Princesses Yuet-nga (Anita Mui), back.

Fei and Mo-sin meet the lord and Yuet-nga but are ambushed by the 14th Prince's assassins and fends them off. As they escort Yuet-nga on the run, they encounter another group of assassins so Mo-siun stays behind while Fei and Yuet-nga continue on. While staying in a cave during the night, Fei and Yuet-nga were attacked by a face-concealed assassin who they encounter again the next day where Fei was impaled and injured while protecting Yuet-nga. Yuet-nga nurses Fei's wound and the two fall in love as they spend time together and Fei gifts her a bunny. Meanwhile, the assassin who attacked Fei and Yuet-nga turns out to be Mo-sin, who was sent by the 14th Prince to spy on his brother. The 14th Prince threatens to poison Mo-sin if she fails to kill his brother by Moon Autumn.

Fei brings Yuet-nga back to his fishing village where she is reunited with the 13th Prince and Lord of Lan-ling announces the engagement of the prince with her daughter, the prince also awards Fei the title of the General of Restoring the Country, but the latter refuses as he is heartbroken and just wants to just live a simple life, and Yuet-nga bides a final farewell to Fei before getting married. At night, Mo-sin found the chance to kill the 13th Prince while the latter was napping, she finds her unable to so haven fallen in love with him. Yuet-nga discovers Mo-sin as a traitor after seeing the 13th Prince's entourage dead and informs the prince. Mo-sin has a change of heart and warns the 13th Prince about his brother's plan.

The next day, the 14th Prince leads his troupes into Fei's village where they slaughter 89 villagers, while Fei singlehandedly kills a number of the troupes in a fit a rage. The 14th Prince then confronts his brother, Yuet-nga and Mo-sin inside the mausoleum where he mortally wounds Mo-sin and the 13th Prince and injures Yuet-nga, until Fei barges in and fights the 14th Prince to avenge the deaths of his fellow villagers. Fei is outmatched until his pet killer whale, Neptune, whips the 14th Prince, allowing Yuet-nga to blind the 14th Prince, who then delivers a devastating blow to Yuet-nga. As Yuet-nga dies in Fei's arms, the 14th Prince gets up and stabs Fei, but he is killed when the King's tomb cracks and falls on him. Fei then narrates how he woke up in the middle of the sea with Neptune afterwards, and the mausoleum has collapsed, with Yuet-nga, the 13th Prince, 14th Prince and Mo-sin buried inside. When Fei revisits years after, wildlife flowers have grown on it, reminding him of the dead bodies beneath it.

Cast
Andy Lau as Fei (阿飛), a simple fisherman and expert swordsman who grew up in his father's fishing village. He befriends the 13th Prince after saving the latter from assassins, who shows an instant trust to Fei, and helps the prince regain his throne.
Kenny Bee as 13th Prince of Yin (燕十三), the ruler of the a State of Yin who was dethroned by his evil brother, the 14th Prince, who is attempting to assassinate him. He befriends Fei after the latter saves him from assassins, who later aids him in regaining his throne.
Anita Mui as Princess Yuet-nga (月牙兒), daughter of Lord Lan-ling and 13th Prince's fiancé. She and Fei falls in love when the latter escorts her back to her fiancé.
Maggie Cheung as Mo-sin (魔仙兒), the 13th Prince's bodyguard who was sent as a spy by the 14th Prince. She has a change of heart after falling in love with the 13th Prince and betrays the 14th Prince.
Kelvin Wong as 14th Prince of Yin (燕十四), the 13th Prince's evil younger brother who attempts to dethrone and assassinate his brother.
Chang Yi as Lord Lan-ling (蘭陵君), ruler of the State of Lan-ling and father Yuet-nga who uses his troupes to assists the 13th Prince in regaining his throne.
Chin Ka-lok as one of 13th Prince's entourage.
Heung Lui
Tam Wai as one of 14th Prince's killer in bamboo forest.
Ng Biu-chuen
Wong Man-kit
Lam Wai-kong
Sam Mei-yiu
Law Yiu-hung
Lui Tat as one of Fei's fellow villagers.
Mak Wai-cheung as one of 14th Prince's killer in the kite field.
Hsiao Ho one of 14th Prince's killer in the kite field.
Leo Tsang as an official beheaded by the 14th Prince.
Hon Ping as one of 14th Prince's killer in the kite field.
Cheung Wing-cheung
Hoi Wai as Neptune (海威), Fei's close pet killer whale.

Music

Critical reception
Empire gave the film a score of 4/5 stars, praising its balance in character development and jaw-breaking action. Andrew Saroch of Far East Films gave the film a similar score of 4/5 stars and praises the quality of the action choreography and the emotional nature of the characters' dilemmas, J. Doyle Wallis of DVD Talk gave the film a score of 3.5/5 stars, praising Andy Lau and Anita Mui's performances, the action choreography and the set locations. Time Out describes the film as "a visually splendid, dramatically rich, but somewhat rarefied martial arts yarn."

References

External links

1992 films
1992 martial arts films
1992 action films
Hong Kong action films
Hong Kong martial arts films
Wuxia films
Kung fu films
1990s Cantonese-language films
Films directed by Sammo Hung
1990s Hong Kong films